Gloucestershire ( abbreviated Glos) is a county in South West England. The county comprises part of the Cotswold Hills, part of the flat fertile valley of the River Severn and the entire Forest of Dean.

The county town is the city of Gloucester and other principal towns and villages include Cheltenham, Cirencester, Kingswood, Bradley Stoke, Stroud, Thornbury, Yate, Tewkesbury, Bishop's Cleeve, Churchdown, Brockworth, Winchcombe, Dursley, Cam, Berkeley, Wotton-under-Edge, Tetbury, Moreton-in-Marsh, Fairford, Lechlade, Northleach, Stow-on-the-Wold, 
Chipping Campden, Bourton-on-the-Water, Stonehouse, Nailsworth, Minchinhampton, Painswick, Winterbourne, Frampton Cotterell, Coleford, Cinderford, Lydney and Rodborough and Cainscross that are within Stroud's urban area.

Gloucestershire borders Herefordshire to the north-west, Worcestershire to the north, Warwickshire to the north-east, Oxfordshire to the east, Wiltshire to the south, Bristol and Somerset to the south-west, and the Welsh county of Monmouthshire to the west.

The current Gloucestershire County Council area does not have the same geographical boundaries as the historic county. Some northern parts of the county, including Long Marston and Welford-on-Avon, were transferred to Warwickshire in 1931. Following the Local Government Act 1972, some southern parts of the county were transferred for administrative purposes to the new county of Avon, which ceased to exist on 1 April 1996. After 1996, the city of Bristol and South Gloucestershire became separate unitary authorities.

History

Gloucestershire is a historic county mentioned in the Anglo-Saxon Chronicle in the 10th century, though the areas of Winchcombe and the Forest of Dean were not added until the late 11th century. Gloucestershire originally included Bristol, then a small town. The local rural community moved to the port city (as Bristol was to become), and Bristol's population growth accelerated during the industrial revolution. Bristol became a county in its own right, separate from Gloucestershire and Somerset in 1373. It later became part of the administrative County of Avon from 1974 to 1996.

Upon the abolition of Avon in 1996, the region north of Bristol became a unitary authority area of South Gloucestershire and is now part of the ceremonial county of Gloucestershire.

In July 2007, Gloucestershire was subject to some of the worst flooding in recorded British history, with tens of thousands of residents affected. The RAF conducted the largest peacetime domestic operation in its history to rescue over 120 residents from flood-affected areas. The damage was estimated at over £2 billion.

Geography and environment
Gloucestershire has three main landscape areas, a large part of the Cotswolds, the Royal Forest of Dean and the Severn Vale. The Cotswolds take up a large portion of the east and south of the county, The Forest of Dean taking up the west, with the Severn and its valley running between these features. The Daffodil Way in the Leadon Valley, on the border of Gloucestershire and Herefordshire surrounding the village of Dymock, is known for its many spring flowers, orchards, and woodland, which attracts many walkers.   In the west, the Wye valley borders Wales.

Governance
Gloucestershire is a ceremonial county in South West England. Gloucestershire County Council's 53 seats are majority-controlled by the Conservatives, though the Liberal Democrats have a sizeable presence on the council. The Council Leader is Mark Hawthorne. The County Council shares responsibility with six district councils: Tewkesbury, Forest of Dean, City of Gloucester, Cheltenham, Stroud and Cotswold.

The southernmost part of the county, South Gloucestershire is governed by South Gloucestershire Council, which is a unitary authority council independent of the county council but the unitary authority is still part of the ceremonial county. Previously, the area of South Gloucestershire was part of the county of Avon. Although Avon was abolished in 1996, some services in South Gloucestershire are still provided in conjunction with other former parts of Avon county, such as the Avon Fire and Rescue Service. Since 2017, South Gloucestershire has been part of the West of England Combined Authority, which is under the directly elected mayor Dan Norris.

There are six parliamentary constituencies in Gloucestershire, all of which are Conservative controlled as of the 2019 general election. Due to the 2023 Periodic Review of Westminster constituencies, Gloucestershire will be combined with Wiltshire for parliamentary boundary purposes, allowing cross-county electoral divisions.

Economy
This is a chart of trend of regional gross value added of Gloucestershire at current basic prices published (pp. 240–253) by Office for National Statistics with figures in millions of Pounds Sterling.

The following is a chart of Gloucestershire's gross value added total in millions of Pounds Sterling from 1997 to 2009 based upon the Office for National Statistics figures

The 2009 estimation of £11,452 million GVA can be compared to the South West regional average of £7,927 million.

Education

Secondary schools

Gloucestershire has mainly comprehensive schools with seven selective schools; two are in Stroud, Stroud High School for girls and Marling School for boys, one in Cheltenham, Pate's Grammar, and four in Gloucester, Sir Thomas Rich's for boys (aged 11–18) and girls (aged 16–18, in the sixth form), and Denmark Road High School and Ribston Hall for girls and The Crypt which is mixed. There are 42 state secondary schools, not including sixth form colleges, and 12 independent schools, including Cheltenham Ladies' College, Cheltenham College and Dean Close School. All but about two schools in each district have a sixth form, but the Forest of Dean only has two schools with sixth forms. All schools in South Gloucestershire have sixth forms.

Higher and further education

Gloucestershire has two universities, the University of Gloucestershire and the Royal Agricultural University, and four higher and further education colleges, Gloucestershire College, Cirencester College, South Gloucestershire and Stroud College and the Royal Forest of Dean College. Each has campuses at multiple locations throughout the county.

The University of the West of England also has three locations in Gloucestershire; an associate faculty (Hartpury College) specialising in animal behaviour and welfare, agricultural and sports-related courses in Hartpury, Gloucestershire; a regional centre at the Gloucester Docks, Alexandra Warehouse, specialising in Adult and Mental Health Nursing; and Frenchay Campus in South Gloucestershire.

Towns and cities

Gloucestershire has one city and 33 towns:

Cities
Gloucester

Towns
The towns in Gloucestershire are:

Berkeley
Bradley Stoke
Cheltenham
Chipping Campden
Chipping Sodbury
Cinderford
Cirencester
Coleford
Dursley
Emersons Green
Fairford
Filton
Kingswood
Lechlade
Lydney
Minchinhampton
Mitcheldean
Moreton-in-Marsh
Nailsworth
Newent
Northleach
Painswick
Patchway
Quedgeley
Stonehouse
Stow-on-the-Wold
Stroud
Tetbury
Tewkesbury
Thornbury
Winchcombe
Wotton-under-Edge
Yate

Suburban town of Stroud:
Cainscross
Town in Monmouthshire with suburbs in Gloucestershire:
Chepstow

Green belt 

The county has two green belt areas, the first covers the southern area in the South Gloucestershire district, to protect outlying villages and towns between Thornbury and Chipping Sodbury from the urban sprawl of the Bristol conurbation. The second belt lies around Gloucester, Cheltenham, and Bishop's Cleeve, to afford those areas and villages in between a protection from urban sprawl and further convergence. Both belts intersect with the boundaries of the Cotswolds AONB.

Transport

Railways
Gloucestershire once had a much larger railway network than it does now with over 100 stations in the county, the vast majority of which were closed during the Beeching cuts. Nowadays, only 15 remain within the county, mostly concentrated on the CrossCountry NE-SW route and around the North Fringe of Bristol. Some stations have been re-opened in recent years; Cam and Dursley railway station opened in 1994, with Ashchurch for Tewkesbury opening three years later. Local campaign groups are also seeking to reopen several disused stations, including Charfield railway station in South Gloucestershire.

Antiquities
There are a variety of religious buildings across the county, notably the cathedral of Gloucester, the abbey church of Tewkesbury (which is over 500 years old and has the tallest Norman tower in England), and the church of Cirencester. Of the abbey of Hailes near Winchcombe, founded by Richard, Earl of Cornwall, in 1246, little more than the foundations are left, but these have been excavated and fragments have been brought to light.

Most of the old market towns have parish churches. At Deerhurst near Tewkesbury and Bishop's Cleeve near Cheltenham, there are churches of special interest on account of the pre-Norman work they retain. There is also a Perpendicular church in Lechlade, and that at Fairford was built (c. 1500), according to tradition, to contain a series of stained-glass windows which are said to have been brought from the Netherlands. These are, however, adjudged to be of English workmanship.

Other notable buildings include Calcot Barn in Calcot, a relic of Kingswood Abbey. Thornbury Castle is a Tudor country house, the pretensions of which evoked the jealousy of Cardinal Wolsey against its builder, Edward Stafford, duke of Buckingham, who was beheaded in 1521. Near Cheltenham is the 15th-century mansion of Southam de la Bere, of timber and stone. Memorials of the de la Bere family appear in the church at Cleeve. The mansion contains a tiled floor from Hailes Abbey. At Great Badminton is the mansion and vast domain of the Beauforts (formerly of the Botelers and others), on the south-eastern boundary of the county. Berkeley Castle at over 800 years old and the ruins of Witcombe Roman Villa at Great Witcombe are also notable heritage features.

There are several royal residences in Gloucestershire, including Highgrove House, Gatcombe Park, and (formerly) Nether Lypiatt Manor.

An annual "cheese-rolling" event takes place at Cooper's Hill, near Brockworth and the Cotswold Games occurred within the county.

Places of interest

Places of interest in Gloucestershire include:

Badminton House, residence of the Dukes of Beaufort 
Berkeley Castle, an example of a feudal stronghold. 
Beverston Castle 
Chavenage House 
Cheltenham Town Football Club
Clearwell Caves
Dean Forest Railway 
Dyrham Park  
Edward Jenner's House  
Gloucester Cathedral 
Gloucester Rugby
Gloucestershire Warwickshire Railway 
Hailes Abbey  
Newark Park  
Owlpen Manor 
Rodborough and Minchinhampton Commons 
Snowshill Manor  
Sudeley Castle, burial place of Queen Catherine Parr, 6th wife and consort of King Henry VIII. 
Stanway House 
River Thames 
Rodmarton Manor 
Severn Bore 
Tewkesbury Abbey 
Tewkesbury Medieval Festival
Tyndale Monument 
Wildfowl and Wetland Trust, Slimbridge
Westbury Court Garden
Woodchester Mansion 

Areas of countryside in Gloucestershire include:

Forest of Dean 
Wye Valley 

Scenic Railway Line:

Gloucester to Newport Line

Media
Gloucestershire's only daily newspaper is the Western Daily Press, while The Citizen, which covers Gloucester, Stroud and the Forest of Dean, and the Gloucestershire Echo, which covers Cheltenham, Tewkesbury and the Cotswolds, were published daily but since October 2017 have been weekly publications.  All three, along with free weeklies The Forester, Stroud Life, The Gloucester News and The Cheltenham and Tewkesbury News, are published by Local World.
The Stroud News & Journal is a weekly paid-for newspaper based in Stroud. It is published in a tabloid format by Newsquest. Newsquest also produces the weekly Wilts and Gloucestershire Standard newspaper, which covers the southern and eastern parts of the county as well as the weekly Gloucestershire Gazette, which covers the south of the county and much of South Gloucestershire.

Gloucester News Centre is an independent news website with news and information for Gloucestershire.

Radio stations in Gloucestershire include BBC Radio Gloucestershire and Heart Gloucestershire, Sunshine Radio and The Breeze (Cheltenham & North Gloucestershire). There are also several community radio stations including Gloucester FM, Radio Winchcombe, Forest of Dean Radio, North Cotswold Community Radio, and Severn FM.

Local TV for the county is provided by BBC West and ITV West Country from Bristol, although in the northern extremes of Gloucestershire, BBC Midlands and ITV Central (West) from Birmingham covers this area. Some eastern parts of the county (Cirencester and parts of the Cotswolds) receive BBC South and ITV Meridian from Oxford.

In popular culture

There are two well-known accounts of childhood in rural Gloucestershire in the early 20th century, Laurie Lee's Cider With Rosie and Winifred Foley's A Child in the Forest. Part of Mrs. Craik's novel John Halifax, Gentleman is set in Enderley, a thinly disguised Amberley, where she lived at the time of writing. Most of the book is set in Nortonbury, easily recognisable as Tewkesbury.

The county has also been the setting for a number of high-profile movies and TV series, including Die Another Day, the Harry Potter films and the BBC TV series Butterflies.

"A Girl's Best Friend", the pilot for the proposed Doctor Who spin-off K-9 and Company, was filmed in Gloucestershire. The setting is the fictional town of Moreton Harwood. The fictional town of Leadworth in Doctor Who is in Gloucestershire. It is the home of companions Amy Pond, Rory Williams and River Song in their childhoods and young adulthoods. Additionally, the 2020 episode "Fugitive of the Judoon" was set and filmed at Gloucester Cathedral.

A fictional Brimpsfield was the village, home of Peter and Abby Grant, in the 1970s BBC TV series Survivors, with a railway connection to London.

Witcombe Festival is an annual music festival held in Brockworth. As well as music, the three-day festival has it roots deep in cider. The festival consists of four stages and has been headlined by Dizzee Rascal, Plan B, Sigma, Ella Eyre, Example, Wiley, Heather Small, Lethal Bizzle and Tinchy Stryder.

The Romano/Celtic temple ruins in Lydney Park contributed to J.R.R. Tolkien's description of The Shire in his Middle-earth Legendarium.

Animals

The famous Gloucestershire Old Spots pig is named for Gloucestershire and is historically associated with the county. Sheep roam widely in the Forest of Dean. The Forest of Dean and the Wye Valley also have wild boar.

Gloucester cattle, a rare breed, can still be found in and around Gloucestershire. They can be recognised by the white stripe that runs down the centre of their backs to the tip of their tails. The cattle are famous for producing milk for both Single Gloucester and Double Gloucester cheeses.

See also

Custos Rotulorum of Gloucestershire – Keepers of the Rolls
Diocese of Gloucester
Gloucestershire (UK Parliament constituency) – Historical list of MPs for Gloucestershire constituency
Gloucestershire County Cricket Club
Gloucestershire Police and Crime Commissioner
Gloucestershire Regiment
High Sheriff of Gloucestershire
Lord Lieutenant of Gloucestershire
List of people from Gloucestershire
List of hills of Gloucestershire
Royal Gloucestershire Hussars
West Country dialects
:Category:Grade I listed buildings in Gloucestershire

References

Further reading
Rudder, Samuel. (1779) A New History of Gloucestershire. Reprint: Nonsuch Publishing, 2006.  (Free download of original here: A New History of Gloucestershire)

External links

Gloucestershire County Council Local government web site
Visit Gloucestershire Gloucestershire Guide

 Images of Gloucestershire at the English Heritage Archive

 
Non-metropolitan counties
Counties in South West England
Counties of England established in antiquity